Sphaerodactylus richardsonii, also known commonly as Richardson's least gecko or the northern Jamaica banded sphaero, is a small species of lizard in the family Sphaerodactylidae. The species is endemic to Jamaica.

Etymology
The specific name, richardsonii, is in honor of Scottish naturalist John Richardson.

The subspecific name, gossei, is in honor of English naturalist Philip Henry Gosse.

Subspecies
Two subspecies are recognized as being valid, including the nominotypical subspecies.
Sphaerodactylus richardsonii gossei 
Sphaerodactylus richardsonii richardsonii

Habitat
The preferred habitats of S. richardsonii are forest and shrubland.

Description
For its genus, S. richardson is stockily-built and long. All the dorsal scales are large, keeled, and imbricate (overlapping). There is no middorsal granular row.

Reproduction
S. richardsonii is oviparous.

References

Further reading
Barbour T (1921). "Sphaerodactylus ". Memoirs of the Museum of Comparative Zoology at Harvard College 47 (3): 215-282 + Plates 1-26. ("Sphaerodactylus richardsonii ", pp. 252–253 + Plate V, figure 3; Plate XIX, figures 1-4).
Boulenger GA (1885). Catalogue of the Lizards in the British Museum (Natural History). Second Edition. Volume I. Geckonidæ ... London: Trustees of the British Museum (Natural History). (Taylor and Francis, printers). xii + 436 pp. + Plates I-XXXII. ("Sphærodactylus richardsonii ",  p. 227 + Plate XVIII, figure 6).
Grant C (1939). "Two New Sphaerodactyls from Jamaica". Copeia 1939 (1): 7-13. ("Sphaerodactylus richardsoni [sic] gossei ", new subspecies, p. 10).
Gray JE (1845). Catalogue of the Specimens of Lizards in the Collection of the British Museum. London: Trustees of the British Museum. (Edward Newman, printer). xxviii + 289 pp. ("Sphærodactylus Richardsonii [sic]", new species, pp. 168–169).
Rösler H (2000). "Kommentierte Liste der rezent, subrezent und fossil bekannten Geckotaxa (Reptilia: Gekkonomorpha)". Gekkota 2: 28-153. ("Sphaerodactylus richardsonii ", p. 114). (in German).
Schwartz A, Henderson RW (1991). Amphibians and Reptiles of the West Indies: Descriptions, Distributions, and Natural History. Gainesville, Florida: University of Florida Press. 720 pp. . ("Sphaerodactylus richardsoni [sic]", p. 527).
Schwartz A, Thomas R (1975). A Check-list of West Indian Amphibians and Reptiles. Carnegie Museum of Natural History Special Publication No. 1. Pittsburgh, Pennsylvania: Carnegie Museum of Natural History. 216 pp. ("Sphaerodactylus richardsoni [sic]", p. 160).
Wilson BS (2011). "Conservation of Jamaican amphibians and reptiles". pp. 273–310. In: Hailey A, Wilson BS, Horrocks JA, editors (2011). Conservation of Caribbean Island Herpetofaunas Volume 2: Regional Accounts of the West Indies. Leiden, Netherlands: Brill Academic Publishers. 440 pp. . ("Sphaerodactylus richardsoni [sic]").

Sphaerodactylus
Endemic fauna of Jamaica
Reptiles of Jamaica
Reptiles described in 1845
Taxa named by John Edward Gray
Taxobox binomials not recognized by IUCN